Kaiwaka "the little town of lights" is a settlement in Northland, New Zealand. The Kaiwaka River runs from the east through the area and joins with the Wairau River to form the Otamatea River, which drains into the Kaipara Harbour. State Highway 1 passes through Kaiwaka. Wellsford is 20 km south, Brynderwyn is 8 km north and Whangarei the closest city, being 60 km (45 minutes drive) north. The Mangawhai Heads are 18 km north east.

The New Zealand Ministry for Culture and Heritage gives a translation of "eating the canoes" for Kaiwaka. The reference to food and canoe may reflect the historic Mangapai portage route between Kaiwaka and Mangawhai linking the East coast with the Kaipara Harbour.

Local tradition also speaks of a cloud that is only observed in this part of the Kaipara. It is seen as an omen that a high ranking person is about to pass on. He kapua pōuri ngā kaiwaka kei runga i te paerangi. He tohu aituā tēnei (Te Ara 2015). / Kaiwaka are threatening clouds on the horizon. This a sign of misfortune.

History

Pre-European history
In February 1825, during the Musket Wars, a major battle between Ngā Puhi and Ngāti Whātua at Te Ika-a-ranga-nui near Kaiwaka resulted in over 170 deaths.

European settlement
Kaiwaka became a trading and commercial point from the late 1850s. As the kauri timber and gum industries declined towards the end of the century, dairy farming became established. The Hakaru Dairy Company was formed to serve Kaiwaka farmers in 1902.

From the 1880s, steamers provided regular service to Kaiwaka from the Otamatea. The Minnie Casey ran a service every Tuesday from 1882. Services continued well into the 20th century.

The Great North Road from Auckland to Whangarei passed through Kaiwaka, but was only a line on a map for much of the 19th century. Attempts were made to improve the road from 1895, and by 1900 the worst places on the road between Kaiwaka and Whangarei were metalled. In 1911, Kaiwaka had a population of 211.

The North Auckland railway line reached Kaiwaka in March 1913, although problems with the terrain, and World War I, meant that it was not extended significantly further north until the early 1920s.

The Lands and Survey Department took over large blocks of unproductive land and developed them in the 1940s, and these were passed to returning soldiers in the early 1950s.

Marae

Kaiwaka's Te Pounga Marae and meeting house on the central peninsula of Kaipara Harbour are a traditional meeting place for Te Uri o Hau and Ngāti Whātua.

Demographics
Kaiwaka is part of the larger Kaiwaka statistical area.

Kaiwaka settlement had a population of 714 at the 2018 New Zealand census, an increase of 129 people (22.1%) since the 2013 census, and an increase of 189 people (36.0%) since the 2006 census. There were 234 households, comprising 348 males and 369 females, giving a sex ratio of 0.94 males per female, with 168 people (23.5%) aged under 15 years, 120 (16.8%) aged 15 to 29, 318 (44.5%) aged 30 to 64, and 102 (14.3%) aged 65 or older.

Ethnicities were 75.2% European/Pākehā, 30.7% Māori, 2.9% Pacific peoples, 6.3% Asian, and 2.1% other ethnicities. People may identify with more than one ethnicity.

Although some people chose not to answer the census's question about religious affiliation, 57.1% had no religion, 25.6% were Christian, 6.7% had Māori religious beliefs, 1.7% were Hindu, 0.4% were Muslim, 0.8% were Buddhist and 2.9% had other religions.

Of those at least 15 years old, 51 (9.3%) people had a bachelor's or higher degree, and 141 (25.8%) people had no formal qualifications. 66 people (12.1%) earned over $70,000 compared to 17.2% nationally. The employment status of those at least 15 was that 252 (46.2%) people were employed full-time, 84 (15.4%) were part-time, and 21 (3.8%) were unemployed.

Kaiwaka statistical area

Kaiwaka statistical area had a population of 2,139 at the 2018 New Zealand census, an increase of 540 people (33.8%) since the 2013 census, and an increase of 687 people (47.3%) since the 2006 census. There were 747 households, comprising 1,080 males and 1,056 females, giving a sex ratio of 1.02 males per female. The median age was 42.6 years (compared with 37.4 years nationally), with 450 people (21.0%) aged under 15 years, 327 (15.3%) aged 15 to 29, 996 (46.6%) aged 30 to 64, and 363 (17.0%) aged 65 or older.

Ethnicities were 79.0% European/Pākehā, 26.2% Māori, 3.5% Pacific peoples, 3.5% Asian, and 2.7% other ethnicities. People may identify with more than one ethnicity.

The percentage of people born overseas was 18.2, compared with 27.1% nationally.

Although some people chose not to answer the census's question about religious affiliation, 58.3% had no religion, 24.7% were Christian, 5.6% had Māori religious beliefs, 0.8% were Hindu, 0.1% were Muslim, 0.8% were Buddhist and 2.1% had other religions.

Of those at least 15 years old, 237 (14.0%) people had a bachelor's or higher degree, and 375 (22.2%) people had no formal qualifications. The median income was $26,200, compared with $31,800 nationally. 183 people (10.8%) earned over $70,000 compared to 17.2% nationally. The employment status of those at least 15 was that 786 (46.5%) people were employed full-time, 294 (17.4%) were part-time, and 48 (2.8%) were unemployed.

Notable people

 Mary Jane Mander, journalist and novelist, attended school in Kaiwaka.
 Tapihana Paraire Paikea, Member of Parliament for Northern Maori, died at Kaiwaka.
 Peter Panyoczki, visual artist, is a resident of Kaiwaka.

Education

Kaiwaka School is a coeducational contributing primary (years 1-6) school with a roll of  students as of 

The school opened in September, 1871, and the school celebrated its centennial in 1970.

Geographic features

Kaiwaka River 
The Kaiwaka River is a prominent feature that begins near Kaiwaka township and flows West, where it joins the Wairau River to form the Otamatea River, which drains into the Kaipara Harbour.

Pukekaroro Scenic Reserve 

Pukekaroro is a distinctive 1.5 km diameter, forest-covered Volcanic dome of dacite dated at 17 million years old rising to 301m 3.5 km north of Kaiwaka on State Highway 1.

The maunga (mountain) Pukekaroro is of great importance to Te Uri o Hau. Pukekaroro was a key strategic site for Te Uri o Hau, as from the very top you are able to see the Mangawhai Heads to the east and the Kaipara Harbour entrance to the west. Traditionally Te Uri o Hau used the timber that grew on the mountain to build waka, which were renown for their seaworthiness.

During the battle known as Te Ika Ranganui in 1825, Karoro, a rangatira who had a pa site at the very top of the mountain retrieved many Te Uri o Hau dead and wounded from the surrounding area and carried them up to the pa so they would not be found by the enemy. Pukekaroro is of special spiritual significance to Te Uri o Hau because of the many Wahi Tapu (sacred area) sites on the mountain. The mountain has been tapu (sacred) since that battle and remains so today.

See also
 Te Whareumu#Te Ika-a-ranga-nui

Notes

External links

 Kaiwaka website
 Kaiwaka Sports Association website

Kaipara District
Populated places in the Northland Region